Ioana Badea (born 22 March 1964) is a retired Romanian rower who won a gold medal in the quadruple sculls at the 1984 Olympics. In 1990, she immigrated to France.

References

External links
 
 
 
 

1964 births
Living people
People from Odobești
Romanian female rowers
Rowers at the 1984 Summer Olympics
Olympic gold medalists for Romania
Olympic medalists in rowing
Medalists at the 1984 Summer Olympics
20th-century Romanian women